Veľké Rovné is a village and municipality in Bytča District in the Žilina Region of northern Slovakia.

History
In historical records the village was first mentioned in 1408.

Geography
The municipality lies at an altitude of 383 metres and covers an area of 42.601 km². It has a population of about 5712 people.

External links
https://web.archive.org/web/20070513023228/http://www.statistics.sk/mosmis/eng/run.html

Villages and municipalities in Bytča District